Aigal may refer to:

Aigal, Iran
Ganapathi Rao Aigal (1881–1944), Indian educator and historian